The 2017 AFC Cup was the 14th edition of the AFC Cup, Asia's secondary club football tournament organized by the Asian Football Confederation (AFC).

Defending champions Al-Quwa Al-Jawiya defeated Istiklol in the final to win their second AFC Cup title.

Association team allocation
The AFC Competitions Committee recommended a new format for the AFC Cup starting from 2017 which is played in the AFC's five zones: West Asia, Central Asia, South Asia, ASEAN, and East Asia, with the winner of the West Asia Zone and the winner of an inter-zone play-off between the other four zones playing in the final, hosted on a rotational basis at venues in the East and West. The 46 AFC member associations (excluding the associate member Northern Mariana Islands) are ranked based on their national team's and clubs' performance over the last four years in AFC competitions, with the allocation of slots for the 2017 and 2018 editions of the AFC club competitions determined by the 2016 AFC rankings (Entry Manual Article 2.2):
The associations are split into five zones:
West Asia Zone consists of the associations from the West Asian Football Federation (WAFF).
Central Asia Zone consists of the associations from Central Asian Football Association (CAFA).
South Asia Zone consists of the associations from the South Asian Football Federation (SAFF).
ASEAN Zone consists of the associations from the ASEAN Football Federation (AFF).
East Asia Zone consists of the associations from the East Asian Football Federation (EAFF).
All associations which do not receive direct slots in the AFC Champions League group stage are eligible to enter the AFC Cup.
In each zone, the number of groups in the group stage is determined based on the number of entries, with the number of slots filled through play-offs same as the number of groups:
In the West Asia Zone and the ASEAN Zone, there are three groups in the group stage, including a total of 9 direct slots, with the 3 remaining slots filled through play-offs.
In the Central Asia Zone, the South Asia Zone, and the East Asia Zone, there is one group in the group stage, including a total of 3 direct slots, with the 1 remaining slot filled through play-offs.
The top associations participating in the AFC Cup in each zone as per the AFC rankings get at least one direct slot in the group stage (including losers of the AFC Champions League qualifying play-offs), while the remaining associations get only play-off slots:
For the West Asia Zone and the ASEAN zone:
The associations ranked 1st to 3rd each get two direct slots.
The associations ranked 4th to 6th each get one direct slot and one play-off slot.
The associations ranked 7th or below each get one play-off slot.
For the Central Asia Zone, the South Asia Zone, and the East Asia zone:
The associations ranked 1st to 3rd each get one direct slot and one play-off slot.
The associations ranked 4th or below each get one play-off slot.
The maximum number of slots for each association is one-third of the total number of eligible teams in the top division.
If any association gives up its direct slots, they are redistributed to the highest eligible association, with each association limited to a maximum of two direct slots.
If any association gives up its play-off slots, they are annulled and not redistributed to any other association.
If the number of teams in the play-offs in any zone is fewer than twice the number of group stage slots filled through play-offs, the play-off teams of the highest eligible associations are given byes to the group stage.

For the 2017 AFC Cup, the associations were allocated slots according to their association ranking published on 30 November 2016, which takes into account their performance in the AFC Champions League and the AFC Cup, as well as their national team's FIFA World Rankings, during the period between 2013 and 2016.

The slot allocation was announced on 7 December 2016. The final slot allocation, after unused slots were redistributed, was announced on 12 December 2016.

Notes

Teams
The following 47 teams from 27 associations entered the competition proper. Only 43 teams from 25 associations competed after the withdrawal of four teams.

Notes

Schedule
The schedule of the competition was as follows (W: West Asia Zone; C: Central Asia Zone; S: South Asia Zone; A: ASEAN Zone; E: East Asia Zone). Starting from 2017, matches in the West Asia Zone were played on Mondays and Tuesdays instead of Tuesdays and Wednesdays.

Qualifying round

Group A

Group B

Group C

Qualifying play-offs

Preliminary round

Play-off round

Group stage

Group A

Group B

Group C

Group D

Group E

Group F

Group G

Group H

Group I

Ranking of second-placed teams

West Asia Zone

ASEAN Zone

Knockout stage

Bracket

Zonal semi-finals

Zonal finals

Inter-zone play-off semi-finals

Inter-zone play-off final

Final

Awards

Top scorers

See also
2017 AFC Champions League

References

External links
, the-AFC.com
AFC Cup 2017, stats.the-AFC.com

 
1
2017